The Hundred of Catt is a cadastral hundred in the County of Way, South Australia established in 1889. It was named for Alfred Catt, member of the state parliament from 1881 to 1902.

The Hundred of Catt (together with the Hundreds of Bartlett, Horn and Moule) were surveyed for closer settlement by William Richard Murray, E B Jones and H J Cant between Nov. 1888 and June 1889. 

Part of the northern boundary of the hundred shared with Yumbarra Conservation Park. 

Localities within the hundred are Watraba (most part), White Well Corner, Koonibba (part), and Uworra.

The traditional owners of the land within the hundred are the Wirangu people.

References

Catt
1889 establishments in Australia